Fountain Square may refer to:

Fountain square, a park or plaza in a city that features a fountain
Fountain Square, Cincinnati, Ohio, U.S.
Fountain Square, Indianapolis, Indiana, U.S.
Fountains Square, Baku, Azerbaijan

See also

Fountain (disambiguation)